The Governor of Misamis Oriental is the head of the local government of Misamis Oriental province in Northern Mindanao, Philippines, elected to three-year terms. The governor is also the head of the executive branch and leads the provincial departments in executing the provincial ordinances and improving public services. The provincial governor is restricted to three consecutive terms totaling nine years, although a governor can be elected again after an interruption of one term.

Misamis Province (District of Cebu)

Undivided Misamis Province

Province of Misamis Oriental

References

External links
https://www.mindanews.com/elections-2019/2019/05/the-leaders-you-voted-misamis-oriental-1987-to-2019/ Mindanews.com

Misamis Oriental